Mehdi Zerkane (born 15 July 1999) is a professional footballer who plays as a winger. Born in France, he plays for the Algeria national team.

Club career

Early career
Zerkane's youth deal with Monaco expired at the end of June 2020.

Bordeaux
He agreed a professional deal with Bordeaux soon after, signing a contract until 2022.

Zerkane made his debut for Bordeaux against Nantes on 21 August 2020, but was sent off for a foul on Nicolas Pallois in a 0–0 draw at the Matmut Atlantique under new coach Jean-Louis Gasset.

On 31 October 2022, he was released from the club after having his contract mutually terminated.

OFI (loan)
On 5 September 2022, Zerkane was loaned for one season with an option to buy to Greek club OFI. On 27 October 2022, his loan was cut short by OFI.

International career
Zerkane was born in France to an Algerian father and Moroccan mother. He debuted for the Algeria national team in a 3–1 2021 Africa Cup of Nations qualification win over Zimbabwe on 12 November 2020.

References

External links
 

Living people
1999 births
Footballers from Auvergne-Rhône-Alpes
Sportspeople from Clermont-Ferrand
Algerian footballers
French footballers
Association football wingers
Algeria international footballers
Algerian people of Moroccan descent
French sportspeople of Algerian descent
French sportspeople of Moroccan descent
Championnat National 3 players
Championnat National 2 players
Ligue 1 players
AS Monaco FC players
FC Girondins de Bordeaux players
OFI Crete F.C. players
Algerian expatriate footballers
Expatriate footballers in Greece
French expatriate sportspeople in Greece
Algerian expatriate sportspeople in Greece